Milas Baxter "Slim" Shoun (October 4, 1904 – October 10, 1983) was an American professional basketball player. He played for the Akron Firestone Non-Skids in the National Basketball League and averaged 2.0 points per game. After his basketball career he remained at the Firestone Tire and Rubber Company for 42 years. He was the brother of Major League Baseball player Clyde Shoun.

References

1904 births
1983 deaths
Akron Firestone Non-Skids players
American men's basketball players
Basketball players from Tennessee
Carson–Newman Eagles men's basketball players
Centers (basketball)
Chicago Bruins players
Fort Wayne Hoosiers (basketball) players
People from Mountain City, Tennessee